Aschwanden is a surname. Notable people with the surname include:

Christie Aschwanden, American journalist and author
Peter Aschwanden (1942–2005), American artist and illustrator
Sergei Aschwanden (born 1975), Swiss judoka
Wilhelm Aschwanden (born 1969), Swiss cross-country skier